Brštanik is a village in the municipalities of Berkovići, Republika Srpska, and Stolac, Bosnia and Herzegovina.

Demographics 
According to the 2013 census, its population was just one Croat in the Berkovići part with no one living in the Stolac part.

References

Populated places in Stolac
Villages in the Federation of Bosnia and Herzegovina